Val d'Europe Agglomération is a communauté d'agglomération in the Seine-et-Marne département and in the Île-de-France région of France. It was created on 1 January 2016 from the former syndicat d'agglomération nouvelle (SAN) du Val d'Europe. It was expanded with two communes in January 2018, and with three communes from the former communauté de communes du Pays Créçois in January 2020. Its seat is in Chessy. Its area is 69.4 km2. Its population was 50,922 in 2018.

Composition
It consists of 10 communes:

Bailly-Romainvilliers
Chessy
Coupvray
Esbly
Magny-le-Hongre
Montry
Saint-Germain-sur-Morin
Serris
Villeneuve-le-Comte
Villeneuve-Saint-Denis

References 

Val d'Europe Agglomération
Val d'Europe Agglomération